The 2009 South Carolina Gamecocks football team represented the University of South Carolina in the 2009 NCAA Division I FBS football season. The team's head coach was Steve Spurrier, who was in his fifth season at USC. The Gamecocks played their home games at Williams-Brice Stadium in Columbia, South Carolina. Carolina finished the season 7–6, winning the Palmetto Bowl over in-state rival Clemson 34–17 in their final regular season game, before losing in the PapaJohns.com Bowl 20–7 against Connecticut.

The victory over Clemson was the first of five in a row, South Carolina's longest win streak in the history of the rivalry.

This season also saw the introduction of "Sandstorm". The 1999 Finnish trance song was played before two decisive plays during a home game against No. 4 Ole Miss. With these plays, South Carolina sealed a historic upset, their first win against a top 5 team since 1981. After this, the song became a Gamecock anthem. By 2021, new head coach Shane Beamer had said that "you hear that song and immediately - I do, and I'm sure most people do - think of South Carolina football."

Preseason
On April 11, 2009, the Garnet squad defeated the Black squad, 30–14, in the annual Garnet & Black Spring Game, in front of a crowd of 25,157. Redshirt sophomore quarterback Stephen Garcia finished the game 13–20 with 144 yards and two touchdowns, while true freshman Jarvis Giles led the ground game with 114 yards and two touchdowns on 12 carries.

Schedule

Schedule notes
Carolina's 2009 schedule was rated the toughest in the nation by college football guru Phil Steele.
Radio coverage for all games was on the Gamecock Sports Radio Network.
The week four game against Ole Miss were played on Thursday, September 24, as part of the ESPN College Football Thursday Primetime package.
The week eleven game against Florida on November 14, 2009 featured the Gamecocks wearing special black and desert camouflage uniforms designed by Under Armour in support of the Wounded Warrior Project.

Game summaries

NC State

Georgia

Florida Atlantic

Ole Miss

SC State

Kentucky

Alabama

Vanderbilt

Tennessee

Arkansas

Florida

Clemson

Connecticut

Players

Depth chart 
Projected starters and primary backups versus Clemson on November 28, 2009.

Awards
Devin Taylor - SEC Defensive Lineman of the Week, 9/7/09; College Football News Third-Team Freshman All-American; SEC Coaches All-Freshmen Team; Rivals.com SEC All-Freshman Team
Jarvis Giles – SEC Freshman of the Week, 9/21/09
Eric Norwood – SEC Defensive Player of the Week, 9/28/09; Butkus Award Finalist; First-Team Coaches All-SEC; First-Team AP All-SEC; First-Team ESPN All-SEC; Walter Camp First-Team All-American; First-Team AP All-American
Alshon Jeffery – SEC Freshman of the Week, 10/12/09; College Football News First-Team Freshman All-American; SEC Coaches All-Freshmen Team; Rivals.com SEC All-Freshman Team; Scout.com Freshman All-American Team; FWAA Freshman All-American Team
Ladi Ajiboye - SEC Co-Defensive Lineman of the Week, 11/30/09
Cliff Matthews – Second-Team Coaches All-SEC; Honorable Mention AP All-SEC
Chris Culliver – Second-Team AP All-SEC
Stephon Gilmore – College Football News First-Team Freshman All-American; SEC Coaches All-Freshmen Team; Rivals.com SEC Defensive Freshman of the Year; Scout.com Freshman All-American Team
T.J. Johnson – SEC Coaches All-Freshmen Team; Rivals.com SEC All-Freshman Team

2009 recruiting class

Rankings

Statistics

Scores by quarter

Team

Offense

Rushing

Passing

Receiving

Defense

Special teams

Coaching staff
Steve Spurrier – Head Coach
Ellis Johnson – Assistant Head Coach & Defense Assistant Coach
Lorenzo Ward – Defensive Coordinator & Safeties
Shane Beamer – Cornerbacks/Special Teams & Recruiting Coordinator
Jay Graham – Running Backs
Johnson Hunter – Tight Ends
Brad Lawing – Defensive Line
G.A. Mangus – Quarterbacks
Steve Spurrier, Jr. – Wide Receivers
Eric Wolford – Offensive Line
 Craig Fitzgerald  – Strength

References

South Carolina
South Carolina Gamecocks football seasons
South Carolina Gamecocks football